Alisson Euler de Freitas Castro (born 25 June 1993), simply known as Alisson, is a Brazilian professional footballer who plays as an attacking midfielder for São Paulo.

Club career

Cruzeiro
Born in Rio Pomba, Minas Gerais, Alisson joined Cruzeiro's youth setup in 2007, aged 13. He subsequently spent a year on loan at Cabofriense's under-17 side before returning and featured for the under-17 and under-20 teams.

Alisson made his first team – and Série A – debut on 18 November 2012, coming on as a second-half substitute for Walter Montillo in a 2–0 away win over Fluminense. He featured in a further two Campeonato Mineiro matches for the club before being loaned to Vasco da Gama on 18 April 2013, as a part of the deal which saw Dedé move to the opposite direction permanently.

While at the Cruzmaltino, Alisson scored his first professional goal, netting the opener in a 2–0 home win over Atlético Mineiro on 5 June 2013. On 6 August, however, after being rarely used, he returned to his parent club.

Back to Cruzeiro, Alisson featured in just nine league matches as the club lifted the Série A title. He scored his first goal for the club on 18 March 2014, netting the third of a 3–0 Mineiro away success over Tombense.

On 8 October 2016, Alisson played his 100th match for Cruzeiro, a 2–0 win over Ponte Preta.

Grêmio
In January 2018, Alisson moved to Grêmio on a four-year deal, with Edílson moving in the opposite direction. He made his debut for the club on 20 January, replacing Isaque in a 3–5 Campeonato Gaúcho home loss against Caxias.

Alisson scored his first goal for Tricolor on 7 February 2018, netting the equalizer in a 2–1 home win over Brasil de Pelotas. On 4 October of the following year, he renewed his contract until 2023.

On 30 January 2020, Alisson played his 100th match for Grêmio, a 2–1 home win over São José-RS.

Career statistics

Honours

Club
Cruzeiro
Campeonato Brasileiro Série A: 2013, 2014
Campeonato Mineiro: 2014

Grêmio
Recopa Sudamericana: 2018
Campeonato Gaúcho: 2018, 2019, 2020, 2021

International
Brazil U20
 Toulon Tournament: 2014

References

External links

1993 births
Living people
Brazilian footballers
Sportspeople from Minas Gerais
Association football midfielders
Campeonato Brasileiro Série A players
Cruzeiro Esporte Clube players
CR Vasco da Gama players
Grêmio Foot-Ball Porto Alegrense players
São Paulo FC players
Brazil under-20 international footballers